Made in Chelsea: Buenos Aires, a spin-off series of Made in Chelsea, a British structured-reality television programme began airing on 9 December 2019, and concluded on 30 December 2019 following four episodes and a special "End of Yah Quiz" hosted by Matt Edmondson and Mollie King. This makes this the shortest of the show's "Out of Chelsea" spin-offs. The series was confirmed on 4 November 2019 when it was announced that the cast of Made in Chelsea would be travelling to Buenos Aires, Argentina to film a special version of the show, however the final episode of the series was filmed back in Chelsea. This was the sixth spin-off series of the show, but the first to air outside of its usual Summer schedule. 

Whilst some of the cast appeared in this series, it also featured notable absences from Eliza Batten, Oliver Proudlock and Victoria Baker-Harber. The new cast members who joined the show included Harvey Armstrong and Sam Holmes. The series heavily focused on new cast member Harvey coming between close friends Habbs and Olivia, as well as Tristan and James's friendship being tested as their partners Verity and Maeva's feud continued. It also featured Sam and Zara facing their first lovers tiff.

Cast

Episodes

{| class="wikitable plainrowheaders" style="width:100%; background:#fff;"
|- style="color:black"
! style="background: #BFF8FF;"| Series no.
! style="background: #BFF8FF;"| Episode no.
! style="background: #BFF8FF;"| Title
! style="background: #BFF8FF;"| Original airdate
! style="background: #BFF8FF;"| Duration
! style="background: #BFF8FF;"| UK viewers

|}

Ratings

References

External links
 

2019 British television seasons
British reality television series
British television spin-offs
Buenos Aires
Buenos Aires
Television shows set in Argentina